Karlštejn Castle is a castle in the Czech Republic. It is a large Gothic castle founded in 1348 by King Charles IV. The castle served as a place for safekeeping the Imperial Regalia as well as the Bohemian Crown Jewels, holy relics, and other royal treasures. Karlštejn belongs to the most famous and most frequently visited castles in the country.

Location

Tourism
Karlštejn is one of the most famous and most frequently visited castles in the Czech Republic. As of 2019, it was the 5th most visited castle with more than 200,000 visitors per year.

History

Founded in 1348, the construction works were directed by the later Karlštejn burgrave Vitus of Bítov, but there are no records of the builder himself. Some historians speculate that Matthias of Arras may be credited with being the architect, but he had already died by 1352. It is likely that there was not a progressive and cunning architect, but a brilliant civil engineer who dexterously and with a necessary mathematical accuracy solved technically exigent problems that issued from the emperor's ideas and requests. Instead, Holy Roman Emperor Charles IV personally supervised the construction works and interior decoration. Construction was finished nearly twenty years later in 1365 when the "heart" of the treasury – the Chapel of the Holy Cross situated in the Great tower – was consecrated.

Following the outbreak of the Hussite Wars, the Imperial Regalia were evacuated in 1421 and brought via Hungary to Nuremberg. In 1422, during the siege of the castle, Hussite attackers used biological warfare when Prince Sigismund Korybut used catapults to throw dead (but not plague-infected) bodies and 2,000 carriage-loads of dung over the walls, apparently managing to spread infection among the defenders.

Later, the Bohemian crown jewels were moved back to the castle and kept there for almost two centuries, with some short breaks. The castle underwent several reconstructions: in late Gothic style after 1480, in Renaissance style in the last quarter of the 16th century. In 1487, the big tower was damaged by fire and during the 16th century there were several adaptations. During the Thirty Years' War in 1619, the coronation jewels and the archive were brought to Prague, and in 1620, the castle was turned over to Ferdinand II, Holy Roman Emperor. After having been conquered in 1648 by Swedes, it fell in disrepair. Finally, a neo-Gothic reconstruction was carried out by Josef Mocker between 1887 and 1899, giving the castle its present look.

The nearby village was founded during the construction of the castle and bore its name until it was renamed to Buda in the wake of the Hussite Wars. Renamed to Budňany in the 18th century, it was merged with Poučník and called Karlštejn. There is a golf club named after the castle nearby.

Architectural description

The castle was built upon a promontory from the south side of Kněží Hora hill, divided from it by a narrow sag. The first gate, a square, two-storey tower with a tall hip roof, stood above a moat at the western slope of the promontory. It was connected with the rampart traverse by means of a small portal. The traverse was protected by battlement and divided by a covered bastion in the middle. The second gate led to the Burgrave House courtyard. Drawbridges closed both entrances. The Burgrave House formed the Karlštejn settlement, it was fortified with a two meters wide rampart, the Well Tower stood slightly lower. In the burgraviate's rampart a third gate was staved – the main entrance into the inner castle.

The core of the castle consisted of three parts placed on three levels-differentiated terraces; every level express different importance. On the lowest terrace there stood the Imperial Palace, above it there was the Marian Tower and the Big Tower stood the highest. The ground space is open to the courtyard, the rest was occupied by a granary. Three rooms form the first floor; largest is the central room, the so-called Knight Hall. The emperor inhabited the second floor of the palace; the floor was divided into four rooms by self-supporting partitions. A spiral staircase connected it with the third floor in which – according to the record from the 16th century – there was a residence of the "empress with her female retinue". The layout and equipment of the second and third floor was approximately the same: bedrooms on the eastern side, then the stateroom, a hall and the rooms in the west.

In the safety of the chapel, behind four doors with nineteen locks to each key was guarded independently, the valuable documents of the state archive were kept along with the symbols of the state power – the Imperial Regalia, later the Czech Crown Jewels.

The Well Tower, being the logistical centerpiece the castle could not function without, was the first part of the castle to be built. The reservoir had to be manually refilled roughly twice a year by opening a floodgate. Considering the significant strategic weakness incurred to the castle by the lack of an independent water source, the existence of the underground channel was a state secret known only to the Emperor himself, and the burgrave. The only other persons aware of its existence were the miners, who were however allegedly massacred on their way from the castle after the construction, leaving no survivors.

Trivia
A miniature replica of the castle was built by a Czech immigrant in Batchelor, Northern Territory, Australia.

Gallery

See also
List of castles in the Czech Republic
Czech Gothic architecture

References

External links

Castle website with many photos

Royal residences in the Czech Republic
Beroun District
Imperial castles
Charles IV, Holy Roman Emperor
Castles in the Central Bohemian Region
Museums in the Central Bohemian Region
Historic house museums in the Czech Republic
National Cultural Monuments of the Czech Republic